Virginie Efira (born 5 May 1977) is a Belgian actress and television presenter.

Efira had her first leading role in the romantic comedy It Boy (2013). She subsequently received critical praise for her performance in the comedy drama In Bed with Victoria (2016), for which she received a Magritte Award for Best Actress as well as a César Award for Best Actress nomination. She then appeared in Paul Verhoeven's psychological thriller Elle (2016), the drama An Impossible Love (2018), the comedy drama Sibyl (2019) and the black comedy Bye Bye Morons (2020).

Efira also played the lead role as Benedetta Carlini in Verhoeven's 2021 follow-up to Elle, Benedetta.

Early life
She is the daughter of Professor André Efira, hemato-oncologist, and Carine Verelst. Efira is of partial Greek-Jewish descent.

Career

1998–2008: Television anchor

She was first hired by Club RTL (a Belgian TV channel in the RTL Group) to present a children's show called Mégamix. She went on to present other programmes in Belgium, including A la recherche de la nouvelle Star. In September 2002, she was offered the job of the presenter of Belgium's version of Star Academy.

After becoming a weather forecast presenter on the M6 channel in France, she soon became one of M6's main public faces, presenting shows such as Le Grand Zap, La saga des ..., Follement Gay, Absolument 80/90, Le Grand Piège and Drôles d'équipes. She was the host of Classé Confidentiel for one year, before replacing Benjamin Castaldi as the host of the popular musical reality show Nouvelle Star for the end of the show's fourth series. She also presents shows on RTL-TVi (a spin-off channel in the RTL Group).

2004–2015: Early roles and romantic parts
Efira's film career began in 2004, appearing as Dr. Liz Wilson in the French-language version of Garfield: The Movie, as well as playing Piper in the French version of the 2005 film Robots. She also voiced the characters of Kitty Softpaws in Puss in Boots and Mavis in Hotel Transylvania (2012) and Hotel Transylvania 2 (2015). Efira also guest-starred in two episodes of the highly successful French show Kaamelott.

In 2010, she participated in Rendez-vous en terre inconnue. Efira next had a supporting role as a social worker in the comedy drama My Worst Nightmare (2011) directed by Anne Fontaine, opposite Isabelle Huppert, Benoît Poelvoorde and André Dussollier. The following year, she won the Audience Award at the 2nd Magritte Awards.

In 2013, Efira starred alongside Pierre Niney in the romantic comedy It Boy, about a 38-year-old woman and her relationship with a teenage boy. The film was highly successful in France and received positive reviews. Variety wrote that she "has a particular talent for transmitting thoughts and eliciting laughs using facial expressions alone, a gift that gets another glorious workout here".

2016–present: Expansion to dramatic roles

In 2016, Efira starred in the romantic comedy-drama In Bed with Victoria, about a single mother and criminal lawyer who goes through a midlife crisis. The film was screened in the International Critics' Week section at the 2016 Cannes Film Festival, where it obtained very favourable reviews. Efira's performance was described by The Hollywood Reporter as both "vibrant" and "well-tuned", and earned her a Magritte Award for Best Actress as well as a César Award for Best Actress nomination. That same year, Efira had a small but crucial role opposite Isabelle Huppert in Paul Verhoeven's psychological thriller Elle. Her final release of 2016 was Up for Love, a romantic comedy with Jean Dujardin, in which she played a lawyer who falls in love with a man of diminutive stature. The following year, she made a guest appearance as herself in one episode of the successful French series Call My Agent!.

In 2018, Efira took on the leading role in the drama An Impossible Love, Catherine Corsini's adaptation of the best-selling novel by Christine Angot – the story of the incestuous father of Angot and her mother who has not seen anything. The film and her performance received critical acclaim. Screen International felt that the actress "previously known for lighter material (In Bed With Victoria), shows herself more than capable of a heavyweight dramatic role, subtly maturing from romantic 20s to careworn middle age" and also added that "she offers a powerful, assured performance in a film that's likely to score highly both as a superior and very accessible melodrama and as an intelligent conversation piece". She received Cesar Award, Globe de Cristal Award and Lumières Award nominations in the Best Actress category for her performance in the film.

That same year, Efira was part of the ensemble cast in the comedy Sink or Swim directed by Gilles Lellouche, which was screened out of competition at the 2018 Cannes Film Festival, and earned her a Cesar Award nomination, for Best Supporting Actress. Also in 2018, her performance in the drama Keep Going was praised, with The Hollywood Reporter writing that she "is excellent here as a woman caught between her fiercely independent nature and her desire to be a good mother, trying to steer her son on the right path". The following year, Efira starred in the comedy drama Sibyl, her second collaboration with director Justine Triet, playing a psychotherapist who wants to return to writing. The film was selected to compete for the Palme d'Or at the 2019 Cannes Film Festival, where it received mostly positive reviews with particular praise for Efira's performance. Variety stated that "Sibyl seals the arrival of Efira, once pegged as a likable but lightweight comedienne, as a first-class leading lady of consistently expanding range and elan — with the emotional honesty and deadpan pluck to pull off the more outrageous character turns in Triet and Arthur Harari’s limber original script." while The Hollywood Reporter felt that "the actress plays several roles at the same time — the astute psychologist, the struggling author, the affectionate yet neglectful mom, the fervid lover in two very candid sex scenes — and she does each one extremely well, turning Sibyl’s altered states into a whole that reflects her drive to be many things at once."

In 2020, she starred opposite Omar Sy in Anne Fontaine's drama Night Shift, in which she played one of three officers who are tasked with escorting an illegal immigrant to the airport, where he will be forced onto a plane and sent back to his homeland. The film premiered at the Berlin International Film Festival. While critical reviews were mixed, Screen International wrote that Efira, "clearly on the verge of an international breakthrough – continues to impress with a cool command, never giving away too much about her character, but evoking intense emotional turmoil behind the calm exterior". That same year, Efira played a terminally-ill hairdresser on a mission to reunite with her long-lost child, with the help of a suicidal bureaucrat and a blind archivist, in the comedy drama Bye Bye Morons directed by Albert Dupontel.

In 2021, Efira reunited with Paul Verhoeven to appear as Benedetta Carlini, a 17th-century nun who suffers from disturbing religious and erotic visions, in the historical drama Benedetta.
Impressed by her performance as the rapist's wife in his previous film Elle, Verhoeven offered her the lead role without even a screen test and did not give her any direction as to what to do, as the actress later explained, "That’s the ultimate sign of trust in your actress. It made me own the role, and I knew that, with what I came up with, Paul would film something interesting. To take the example of Benedetta’s ambiguity, is it up to me to act ambiguity? Or it up to him to film it? I played Benedetta on a quest, without defining the nature of that quest. I think it’s a multifaceted quest. It cannot be reduced to a specific aspect, such as absolute faith or the most duplicitous scheming. Both aspects feed off each other. Benedetta has a strong belief in Jesus, and she is also looking for power. She is not all sweetness and altruism."

Personal life
She was married to Patrick Ridremont from 2002 to 2005 when they separated. They filed for divorce in February 2009. From 2013 to 2014, she was engaged to Mabrouk El Mechri, with whom she has a daughter, Ali, born 24 May 2013 in Paris. She is now in a relationship with Niels Schneider. She became a French citizen in 2016.

Filmography

Feature films

Television

Dubbing

Awards and nominations

References

Sources
 This article is based on the translation of the corresponding article of the French Wikipedia.

External links

 
 
 

1977 births
Living people
Magritte Award winners
21st-century Belgian actresses
Belgian film actresses
Belgian people of Greek-Jewish descent
Belgian television presenters
Belgian women television presenters
Best Actress César Award winners
Best Actress Lumières Award winners